Muhammad Arif may refer to:

Muhammad Arif Khan Rajbana Sial (19132010), Pakistani chieftain and politician
Hajji Muhammad Arif Zarif (19432007), Afghan politician and businessman
Muhammad Arif Shah Jahan (born 1954), Afghan politician and governor of Wardak province
Muhammad Arif Khan Sindhila (born 1958), member of the Provincial Assembly of the Punjab
Muhammad Arif Chaudhry (born 1959), former member of the National Assembly of Pakistan
Muhammad Arif Sarwari (born 1961), Afghan politician and intelligence officer
Muhammad Arif Abbasi (born 1965), former member of the Provincial Assembly of the Punjab
Muhammad Arif (Pakistani politician), member of the Provincial Assembly of the Balochistan